Frank Chouteau Brown (1876–1947) was an American architect, born in Minneapolis, Minnesota, and educated at the Minneapolis School of Fine Arts, the Boston Art Club and in Europe. In 1902, he began practice in Boston and from 1907 to 1919, was editor of the Architectural Review periodical. In 1916, he became a member of the faculty of Boston University and in 1919, head of the Department of Art and Architecture. 

He was the architectural designer of the 1933 renovation of the Dillaway–Thomas House in Roxbury, Massachusetts.

Selected bibliography

References

External links
 
 
 

Boston University faculty
Architects from Minneapolis
Architects from Boston
20th-century American architects
1876 births
1947 deaths